The World Group was the highest level of Davis Cup competition in 1986.

Australia won the title, defeating the two-time defending champions Sweden in the final, 3–2. The final was held at the Kooyong Stadium in Melbourne, Australia, from 26 to 28 December. It was the Australian team's first Davis Cup title since 1983 and their 26th Davis Cup title overall.

Participating teams

Draw

First round

Mexico vs. West Germany

Ecuador vs. United States

New Zealand vs. Australia

Great Britain vs. Spain

Yugoslavia vs. Soviet Union

India vs. Czechoslovakia

Italy vs. Paraguay

Denmark vs. Sweden

Quarterfinals

Mexico vs. United States

Great Britain vs. Australia

Yugoslavia vs. Czechoslovakia

Sweden vs. Italy

Semifinals

Australia vs. United States

Czechoslovakia vs. Sweden

Final

Australia vs. Sweden

Relegation play-offs
The first-round losers played in the Relegation Play-offs. The winners of the play-offs advanced to the 1987 Davis Cup World Group, and the losers were relegated to their respective Zonal Regions.

Results summary
Date: 3–5 October

West Germany vs. Ecuador

Spain vs. New Zealand

India vs. Soviet Union

Paraguay vs. Denmark

References

External links
Davis Cup official website

World Group
Davis Cup World Group
Davis Cup